Li Danyang (born 8 April 1990) is a Chinese footballer who plays as a defender. She has been a member of the China women's national team.

References

1990 births
Living people
Chinese women's footballers
Women's association football defenders
China women's international footballers
Footballers at the 2010 Asian Games
Asian Games competitors for China